Nishan Randhawa (born 5 December 1997) is a Canadian freestyle wrestler. He participated in the 2022 Commonwealth Games in the wrestling competition, being awarded the gold medal in the men's freestyle 97 kg event.

He competed in the 97kg event at the 2022 World Wrestling Championships held in Belgrade, Serbia.

Personal life
Randhawa is of Punjabi descent.

References

Canadian male sport wrestlers
Living people
Commonwealth Games gold medallists for Canada
Commonwealth Games medallists in wrestling
Wrestlers at the 2022 Commonwealth Games
21st-century Canadian people
1997 births
Canadian sportspeople of Indian descent
Canadian people of Punjabi descent
Medallists at the 2022 Commonwealth Games